Lucia Chamberlain (February 16, 1882 – December 3, 1978) was an American novelist. Her 1909 book The Other Side of the Door was the basis of a 1916 film of the same name, and her 1917 story The Underside formed the basis of the 1920 film Blackmail. The 1916 film The Wedding Guest is also based on her writing.

Early life 
Chamberlain was born in San Francisco, the daughter of John Chamberlain and Mary Curtis Chamberlain. Her maternal grandfather Lucien Curtis was an engraver from Connecticut, and her mother had a wood engraving business in the city in the 1870s. Her aunt, Mary Curtis Richardson, was a noted portrait artist.  She and her sister were encouraged to write by Canadian poet Bliss Carman.

Career 
WorldCat lists Chamberlain's genres of writing as fiction, detective and mystery fiction, short stories, and Western fiction.

H. L. Mencken, writing in The Smart Set in 1909, described The Other Side of the Door as: "A mildly diverting tale of adventure, with the scene laid in early San Francisco, and a fiery Latin flavor in some of the characters."

Chamberlain wrote her first two books, Mrs. Essington and The Coast of Chance, in collaboration with her older sister, Esther, who owned an advertising agency in New York. Mrs. Essington was reviewed in The New York Times. Esther died in 1908.

In 1932, Chamberlain co-organized an exhibition of works by Mary Curtis Richardson, at the California Palace of the Legion of Honor in San Francisco.

Personal life 
Lucia Chamberlain lived on Russian Hill in San Francisco. She died in 1978, in Santa Cruz, California, aged 96 years.

Selected publications

References

External links

1882 births
1978 deaths
Novelists from California
20th-century American women writers
American women novelists
Writers from San Francisco